Clifton is a historically African Americnan unincorporated community in Boyle County, Kentucky, United States.

See also
 Clifford K. Berryman
 Clifton Baptist Church Complex

References

Unincorporated communities in Boyle County, Kentucky
Unincorporated communities in Kentucky
African-American history of Kentucky